The Eternal Tone is a 1943 German drama film directed by Günther Rittau and starring Elfriede Datzig, Rudolf Prack and Olga Tschechowa.

It was shot at the Babelsberg and Tempelhof Studios in Berlin and on location in Kitzbühel in Tyrol. The film's sets were designed by the art director Artur Günther.

Cast
 Elfriede Datzig as Therese
 Rudolf Prack as Berthold Buchner
 Olga Tschechowa as Josephine Malti, Singer
 Wilhelm Borchert as Matthias Buchner
 O.E. Hasse as Impresario Grundmann
 Georges Boulanger as Mit sein Ensemble
 Hans Dengel as Holzfäller
 Georg Vogelsang as Florian
 Olga Engl as Zuhörerin
 Leopold Esterle as Holzfäller
 Karl Etlinger as Ladeninhaber
 Liselotte Schaak as Zuhörerin
 Eva Krause as Zofe Nanette
 Eva Klein-Donath as Zuhörerin
 Jack Trevor as American
 Georg H. Schnell as American
 Carl Söllner
 Eduard Gautsch as Mitglied der Geigenbauerzunft
 Helmi Mareich as Junges Mädchen
 Karl Harbacher
 Hans Kratzer as Wirt
 Ludwig Schmid-Wildy as Mitglied der Geigenbauerzunft
 Karl Körner as Preisrichter
 Hadrian Maria Netto as Alte Exzellence
 Karl Platen as Diener
 Ekkehard Röhrer as Geselle
 Rudolf Schündler as Schneidermeister
 Richard Ludwig as American
 Kate Kühl as Zuhörerin
 Kurt Henneberg as Geige für R.Prack

References

Bibliography 
 Bock, Hans-Michael & Bergfelder, Tim. The Concise CineGraph. Encyclopedia of German Cinema. Berghahn Books, 2009.
 Hake, Sabine. German National Cinema. Routledge, 2002.

External links 
 

1943 drama films
1943 films
Films directed by Günther Rittau
Films of Nazi Germany
Films shot at Babelsberg Studios
Films shot at Tempelhof Studios
Films shot in Austria
German black-and-white films
German drama films
1940s German-language films
Terra Film films
1940s German films